Aye Mya Kyi Lin is a market and shopping centre in Kyaukse in the Mandalay Division of central Burma.

Shopping malls and markets in Myanmar
Mandalay Region